The 2012–2013 BSL final was the championship game of 2012–2013 Israeli Basketball Super League played at the Romema Arena in Haifa on 13 July between defending champion Maccabi Tel Aviv and home team Maccabi Haifa. Maccabi Haifa won their first ever title after an 86–79.

Road to the final

Match details

References

2012 in Israeli sport
2013 in Israeli sport
Basketball